Ceridia heuglini is a moth of the family Sphingidae. It is known from savanna and grassland from Mali and Chad to Sudan, the Central African Republic and Uganda.

The length of the forewings is about 30 mm. The ground colour of the forewings and body is pale pinkish brown. There is a chocolate coloured narrow median stripe on the head and thorax. The forewings have a conspicuous chocolate marking which touches the costa, leaving the intervening areas pinkish brown. There is a large rounded chocolate stigma touching the lower part of this chocolate marking and a rounded chocolate marking edged proximally with pale pink at the apex. There are several faint, sinuous dark transverse lines. The hindwings are paler, more pink and unmarked.

References

Smerinthini
Moths described in 1874
Moths of Africa